Shaheed Barkat Stadium is a football stadium owned and operated by National Sports Council in Gazipur, Bangladesh.

See also
List of cricket grounds in Bangladesh
Stadiums in Bangladesh

References

Football venues in Bangladesh